Walls of Jericho usually refers to the destruction of the walls of Jericho in the biblical history of the Battle of Jericho.

It may also refer to:

Archaeology
 Wall of Jericho (Neolithic), prehistoric wall around the city of Jericho

Music
 "Walls of Jericho", a song by industrial pioneers Cabaret Voltaire
 Walls of Jericho (album), debut album by German power metal band Helloween
 Walls of Jericho (band), American metalcore band

Books, Film and TV
 "Walls of Jericho" (Jericho episode), 2006 episode of American TV series Jericho
 The Walls of Jericho (1948 film), an American drama film 
 The Walls of Jericho (1914 film), a 1914 American silent drama film
 The Walls of Jericho, 1928 book by Rudolph Fisher
 "The Walls of Jericho", a 1967 episode of the TV series The Time Tunnel

Places
 The Walls of Jericho (canyon), a preserved nature area in North Alabama and Middle Tennessee

Other
 The Walls of Jericho, a finishing move of professional wrestler Chris Jericho